The Red Crystal: The Seven Secrets of Life is a role-playing video game for MS-DOS developed and published by Quantum Quality Productions in 1994.

Gameplay

Reception

Computer Gaming World in March 1994 described The Red Crystal as "Gauntlet gone amuck". A longer review in April 1994 criticized the game's many "pointless" random encounters, necessity to reroll for "demi-godlike" attributes and use "cowardly hit-and-run" combat tactics to survive, poor documentation, abruptly unwinnable moments, and other flaws. The magazine concluded "we can't believe that it says QQP on this game's box". Reviewing the game for PC Gamer US, Neil Randall wrote, "Despite some clumsy interface elements, Red Crystal is worthwhile. It's fast, fun, and refuses to take itself too seriously." PC Zone offered a negative review, concluding, "Don't ask your friends to play this if you want to keep them." Jörg Langer of Germany's PC Player summarized The Red Crystal as "a very bad game" and a "tragedy". He criticized its sound and found it "disappointing" from a technical angle, calling the collision detection and mouse control "amateurly programmed". Langer argued, "After no more than five minutes, an immense boredom sets in."

In 1996, Computer Gaming World named The Red Crystal the 22nd worst game ever made. The editors called it "deadly proof that QQP should have stuck to strategy/wargames."

References

External links 

 MobyGames

1994 video games
DOS games
DOS-only games
Fantasy video games
Single-player video games
Role-playing video games
Video games developed in the United States
Video games scored by Sam Powell
Quantum Quality Productions games